Harry Knowlton Brown (December 13, 1897 – November 15, 1974) was a provincial politician from Alberta, Canada. He served as a member of the Legislative Assembly of Alberta from 1935 to 1940, sitting with the Social Credit caucus in government. He was also a dentist who served as Director of Dental Public Health in the Department of National Health and Welfare in Ottawa.

References

Alberta Social Credit Party MLAs
1974 deaths
1897 births